Meris Muhović (born 13 January 1992 in Sarajevo, SR Bosnia and Herzegovina) is a leading Bosnian karate competitor and part of the Bosnia and Herzegovina national karate team.

Personal life
Meris is the younger brother of Karate European gold medalist Denis Muhović, who is also his coach.

Achievements
2008
  Junior European Championship – 15 February, Rome, ITA – kumite -78 kg
2011
  U21 European Championship – 11 February, Belgrade, SRB – kumite -78 kg
2014
  European Championship – 1 May, Tampere, FIN – kumite -84 kg
2015
  Premier League – 26 September, Coburg, GER – kumite -84 kg
2016
  World Cup – 12 March, Laško, SLO – kumite -84 kg
  European Championship – 5 May, Montpellier, FRA – kumite -84 kg
2017
  Series A – 7 October, Salzburg, AUT – kumite -84 kg

References

External links
Meris Muhović at stats.karate-data
Meris Muhović at karaterec.com

1992 births
Living people
Bosnia and Herzegovina male karateka
Sportspeople from Sarajevo
Shotokan practitioners
Competitors at the 2018 Mediterranean Games
Mediterranean Games competitors for Bosnia and Herzegovina
Competitors at the 2022 Mediterranean Games